The 1981 Merseyside County Council election took place on 7 May to elect members of Merseyside County Council in England. This was on the same day as other local elections.

Election results

Overall election result

Overall result compared with 1977.

Results by borough

Knowsley

Turnout: 31.9% (2.1%)

Liverpool

Turnout: 37.1% (3.2%)

Sefton

Turnout: 36.6% (2.6)

St Helens

Turnout: 35.7% (1.6%)

Wirral

Turnout: 39.9% (1.9%)

Notes

References

1981
1981 English local elections
1970s in Merseyside